Quncha Urqu (Quechua quncha mushroom, urqu mountain, "mushroom mountain", Hispanicized spelling Joncha Orjo)  is a mountain in the Wansu mountain range in the Andes of Peru, about  high. It is situated in the Apurímac Region, Antabamba Province, Antabamba District. Quncha Urqu lies near Saywa Punta, Llulluch'a, Lluqu Chuyma and Q'illu in the northeast, south, southwest and north.

References 

Mountains of Peru
Mountains of Apurímac Region